The 2022–23 season is the 7th season in the existence of Real Madrid Femenino and the club's 3rd season since being officially rebranded as part of Real Madrid. In addition to the domestic league, they are participating in this season's edition of the Copa de la Reina having already been eliminated from the UEFA Women's Champions League and the Supercopa de España earlier in the season.

Alberto Toril continued as the club's manager after replacing David Aznar during the previous season. The club's most notable signing of the summer transfer window was Caroline Weir who joined from Manchester City on a free transfer.

However, the club's push to join rivals Barcelona as the pre-eminent powers of women's football in Spain did not end there. Kathellen, a winner of the Copa América with Brazil in July, signed in August from Inter Milan while Freja Olofsson became the most-expensive signing in club history when she joined from Racing Louisville for a fee which, according to reports, was in excess of €100,000. Experienced veteran Sandie Toletti, a member of France's semi-finalist squad at the Euros, was also signed to bolster the team's midfield.

Players

First-team squad

As of 24 February 2023

Transfers

In

Out

Pre-season and friendlies 
Real Madrid began the season by competing in the four-team Copa Sentimiento held in Aranguren. The squad then travelled to Prague for a temporary training camp and a pair of friendlies ahead of their return to Spain prior to their opening match of the competitive season.

Competitions

Overall record

Liga F

League table

Results summary

Results by round

Matches

Copa de la Reina

Having suffered elimination at the hands of rivals Barcelona in four consecutive knock-out ties across three competitions, Real Madrid were granted a reprieve when Barça—the three times consecutive winners of the Copa de la Reina—were expelled from the tournament for using an ineligible player.

Supercopa de España Femenina

The draw for the semi-finals was held on 21 December 2022 in Mérida.

UEFA Champions League

First Qualifying Round

The first round draw was held on 24 June 2022.

Bracket 
Hosted by Real Madrid.

Second Qualifying Round

The second round draw was held on 1 September 2022.

Real Madrid won 5–1 on aggregate.

Group stage

The group stage draw was held on 3 October 2022.

Statistics

Goals

References

External links

Real Madrid Femenino seasons
2022–23 in Spanish women's football
Spanish football clubs 2022–23 season